Proasteio or Proastio may refer to several places in Greece:

Proastio, Karditsa, a town in the Karditsa regional unit
Proastio, Kozani, a town in the Kozani regional unit
Proastio, Messenia, a village in the municipal unit Lefktro, Messenia 
Proastio, Patras, a neighbourhood in the north of Patras, Achaea